Fascist symbolism is the use of certain images and symbols which are designed to represent aspects of fascism. These include national symbols of historical importance, goals, and political policies. The best-known are the fasces, which was the original symbol of fascism, and the swastika of Nazism.

Common symbols of fascist movements

Organized fascist movements have militarist-appearing uniforms for their members; use historical national symbols as symbols of their movement; and use orchestrated rallies for propaganda purposes. Fascist movements are led by a "Leader" (e.g. Duce, Führer, Caudillo) who is publicly idolized in propaganda as the nation's saviour. A number of fascist movements use a straight-armed salute.

The use of symbols, graphics, and other artifacts created by fascist, authoritarian and totalitarian governments has been noted as a key aspect of their propaganda. Most fascist movements adopted symbols of Ancient Roman or Greek origin, for example the German use of Roman standards during rallies and the Italian adoption of the fasces symbol. The Spanish Falange took its name from the Spanish word for the Greek phalanx.

Militarist uniforms with nationalist insignia
Organized fascist movements typically use military-like uniforms with the symbol of their movement on them.

In Italy, the Italian Fascist movement in 1919 wore black military-like uniforms, and were nicknamed Blackshirts. In power, uniforms during the Fascist era extended to both the party and the military which typically bore fasces or an eagle clutching a fasces on their caps or on the left arm section of the uniform.

In Germany, the fascist Nazi movement was similar to the Italian Fascists in that they initially used a specifically colored uniform for their movement, the tan-brown colored uniform of the SA paramilitary group earned the group and the Nazis themselves the nickname of the Brownshirts. The Nazis used the swastika for their uniforms and copied the Italian Fascists' uniforms, with an eagle clutching a wreathed swastika instead of a fasces, and a Nazi flag arm sash on the left arm section of the uniform for party members.

Other fascist countries largely copied the symbolism of the Italian Fascists and German Nazis for their movements. Like them, their uniforms looked typically like military uniforms with Nationalist type insignia of the movement. The Spanish Falange adopted dark blue shirts for their party members, symbolizing Spanish workers, many of whom wore blue shirts. Berets were also used, representing their Carlist supporters. The Spanish Blue Division expeditionary volunteers sent to the Eastern Front of WWII in (relatively indirect) support of the Germans likewise wore blue shirts, berets and their army trousers.

Fascist use of heraldry
Fascist governments often saw the need to change the heraldry of their nations; in Germany, the arms of Coburg, featuring the head of Saint Maurice, was looked down upon for its religious and un-Aryan nature. It was replaced in 1934 with a coat of arms featuring a sword and swastika. Thuringia also saw the need to support the Nazi regime by adding a swastika to the paws of the lion on its coat of arms. In Italy, the chief of a coat of arms is often used to indicate political allegiance. Under the government of Mussolini, many families and locales adopted a red chief charged with a fasces to indicate allegiance to the National Fascist Party; this chief was called the capo del littorio. Francisco Franco, Chief of State of Francoist Spain, used a personal coat of arms featuring the Royal Bend of Castile, a heraldic symbol used by the Crown of Castile.

Italy

The original symbol of fascism in Italy under Benito Mussolini was the fasces. This is an ancient Imperial Roman symbol of power carried by lictors in front of magistrates; a bundle of sticks featuring an axe, indicating the power over life and death. Before the Italian Fascists adopted the fasces, the symbol had been used by Italian political organizations of various political ideologies, called Fasci ("leagues") as a symbol of strength through unity.

Italian Fascism utilized the color black as a symbol of their movement, black being the color of the uniforms of their paramilitaries, known as Blackshirts. The blackshirt derived from Italy's daredevil elite shock troops known as the Arditi, soldiers who were specifically trained for a life of violence and wore unique blackshirt uniforms. The colour black, as used by the Arditi, symbolized death.

Other symbols used by the Italian Fascists included the aquila, the Capitoline Wolf, and the SPQR motto, each related to Italy's ancient Roman cultural history, which the Fascists attempted to resurrect.

Germany

The nature of German fascism, as encapsulated in Nazism was similar to Italian Fascism ideologically and borrowed symbolism from the Italian Fascists such as the use of mass rallies, the straight-armed Roman salute, and the use of pageantry. Nazism was different from Italian Fascism in that it was officially racist. Its symbol was the swastika, at the time a commonly seen symbol in the world that had experienced a revival in use in the western world in the early 20th century. German völkisch Nationalists claimed the swastika was a symbol of the Aryan race, who they claimed were the foundation of Germanic civilization and were superior to all other races.

As the Italian Fascists adapted elements of their ethnic heritage to fuel a sense of Nationalism by use of symbolism, so did Nazi Germany. Turn-of-the-century German-Austrian mystic and author Guido von List was a big influence on Reichsführer-SS Heinrich Himmler, who introduced various ancient Germanic symbols (filtered through von List's writings) more thoroughly into the SS, including the stylized double Sig Rune (von List's then-contemporary Armanen rune version of the ancient sowilo rune) for the organization itself.

The black-white-red tricolor of the German Empire was utilized as the color scheme of the Nazi flag. The color brown was the identifying color of Nazism (and fascism in general), due to its being the color of the SA paramilitaries (also known as Brownshirts).

Other historical symbols that were already in use by the German Army to varying degrees prior to the Nazi Germany, such as the Wolfsangel and Totenkopf, were also used in a new, more industrialized manner on uniforms and insignia.

Although the swastika was a popular symbol in art prior to the regimental use by Nazi Germany and has a long heritage in many other cultures throughout history - and although many of the symbols used by the Nazis were ancient or commonly used prior to the advent of Nazi Germany - because of association with Nazi use, the swastika is often considered synonymous with Nazism and some of the other symbols still carry a negative post-World War II stigma in Western countries, to the point where some of the symbols are banned from display altogether.

Spain

The fascist Falange in Spain utilized the yoke and arrows as their symbol. It historically served as the symbol of the shield of the monarchy of Ferdinand and Isabella and subsequent Catholic monarchs, representing a united Spain and the "symbol of the heroic virtues of the race". The original uniform of the Falangistas was the blue shirt – derived from the blue overalls of industrial workers – which was later combined with the red beret of the Carlists to represent their merger by Franco.

Poland

Several Polish far-right and nationalist organizations have used the Mieczyk Chrobrego ([Boleslaus] the Brave's Sword), which resembles the Szczerbiec, or the coronation sword of Polish kings. The same organisations have used the falanga sword, a symbol associated with the extreme right in the country after Mieczyk Chrobrego was banned; most notably it is used by the ONR and NOP as their main identifying symbols. Among other symbols Toporzeł is also used, a symbol with strong anti-Semitic connotations.

Other places

Many other fascist movements did not win power or were relatively minor regimes in comparison and their symbolism is not well-remembered today in many parts of the world, although the BUF's Flash and Circle was later used by the non-fascist People's Action Party of Singapore.

In alphabetical order by nation:

 Austria's Fatherland's Front, that ruled the country from 1933 to 1938, used the crutch cross as its symbol.
 Lightning bolts were a common symbol of Sir Oswald Mosley's British Union of Fascists, appearing on uniforms, newspaper mastheads, badges and on the movement's flags. The symbol completely replaced the fasces used from 1932 to 1935 with the adoption of the Flash and Circle.
 The Brazilian Integralist Action used an upper case sigma (Σ), to represent the summation of all things under the State.
 The symbol of the Bulgarian national-socialist Ratnik movements was a sun cross named "Bogar".
 The symbol of the Croatian Ustaše movement was capital letter U with the flaming grenade and the Croatian coat of arms.
 A prominent symbol of the Greek 4th of August Regime was the Labrys/Pelekys, the double-headed axe which Ioannis Metaxas thought to be the oldest symbol of all Hellenic civilizations.
 Greece's far-right, ultra-nationalist Golden Dawn Party uses a flag depicting a meandros in a style and color scheme reminiscent of the Nazi swastika.
 The symbol of Hungary's fascistic Arrow Cross Party was the Arrow Cross.
 The Kataeb Party of Lebanon is known in English as the Phalange Party which a derivation of the Spanish spelling for Fascist.
 The National Socialist Movement in the Netherlands (NSB) used the Wolfsangel as its main symbol.
 The symbol of the Norwegian Nasjonal Samling was as golden/yellow sun cross on red background.
 The symbol of Salazar's Portuguese Estado Novo regime was a stylized version of the Christ Cross and shield found on the national flag to distinguish its rivals in the Movimento Nacional-Sindicalista used the Order of Christ Cross.
 The symbol of the Romanian Iron Guard was a triple cross (a variant of the triple parted and fretted) – three parallel verticals intersected with three parallel horizontals, usually in black; it was meant to represent prison bars, as a badge of martyrdom. It was sometimes deemed the Archangel Michael Cross, after the patron saint of the movement.
 The symbol of the Silver Legion of America was a silver flag with a scarlet letter L.
 The Russian Movement Against Illegal Immigration, which is often considered to be a moderate and legal neo-Nazi movement, uses the black-colored road sign "Stop Prohibited" (similar to the swastika) as their main symbol.
The quasi-Fascist Yugoslav ZBOR used a green shield with a blade of wheat on it, with a sword crossing the shield.

Contemporary usage

Some neo-Nazi organizations continue to use the swastika, but many have moved away from such inflammatory symbols of early fascism. Some neo-fascist groups use symbols that are reminiscent of the swastika or other cultural or ancestral symbols that may evoke nationalistic sentiment but do not carry the same racist connotations.

 Crosses:
 Arrow cross – Arrow Cross Party in Hungary
 Celtic cross – used by neo-Nazi white nationalist groups worldwide, the Italian New Force, Stormfront, David Duke's website, VSBD/PdA, a banned German neo-Nazi party and the British People's Party, a banned British neo-Nazi party
 Cross crosslet – Lithuanian National Socialist Party
 Sun cross – Swedish Nordic Realm Party, Knights Party
 Swastika – continues to be used by neo-Nazi groups such as the American Nazi Party, the São Paulo Skinheads in Brazil, and was used by the National Socialist Front of Sweden
 Bladed swastika – Russian National Unity
 Wolfsangel symbol 
 Used by the SS and Hitlerjugend as well as various neo-Nazi groups
 Azov Battalion in Ukraine
 Black Sun - Used by the Azov Battalion and Vanguard America as well as other groups such as Volksfront. The shooter behind the Christchurch mosque shootings engraved it on his guns and put it on the cover of his manifesto.
 Labrys (or Pelekys) – a Minoan double-headed axe, used by some fascist Greek nostalgics
 Runes:
 Algiz rune – Allgermanische Heidnische Front, National Alliance in the United States
 Odal rune - common among various neo-Nazi groups
 Sigel rune, especially on the Schutzstaffel badge, sometimes confused with or used interchangeably with Eihwaz
 Tyr rune was on the badge of the SA Reichsführerschulen in Nazi Germany, and is sometimes used by neo-Nazis such as Nordic Resistance Movement
 Orkhon script letters – used by followers of Nihal Atsiz, e.g.Türkçü Toplumcu Budun Derneği
 Triskelion-like symbol composed of three 7s – Afrikaner Weerstandsbeweging (Afrikaner Resistance Movement), Republic of South Africa
 Neo-Nazis typically use Nordic Pagan symbols, including Mjölnir.

Pejorative symbolism
Opponents of fascism use pejorative symbols to represent fascism, such as the jackboot.

See also

 Anarchist symbolism
 Communist symbolism
 Rising Sun Flag#Controversy
 Schwarze Sonne
 Strafgesetzbuch section 86a
 Western use of the swastika in the early 20th century
 Modern display of the Confederate flag
 Z (military symbol)

References

External links
 Neonazi flags
 Neonazi flag symbolism
 Fascist signs and symbols at Forbidden Symbols 

 
Neo-Nazism
Swastika